Warhorse Studios s.r.o. is a Czech video game developer based in Prague. Founded in July 2011 by Dan Vávra and Martin Klíma, the studio produced Kingdom Come: Deliverance, which was released in February 2018. In February 2019, the company was acquired by Plaion.

History 
Warhorse Studios’ foundation was announced on 25 July 2011 by Dan Vávra, formerly a writer and game designer for 2K Czech, and Martin Klíma, formerly a producer for Bohemia Interactive. Early hires were Viktor Bocan and Zbyněk Trávnický. The studio's first project was role-playing video game Kingdom Come: Deliverance, which was released on 13 February 2018. As of August 2019, Warhorse had 131 employees.

On June 10, 2021, it was announced that Warhorse Studios would be collaborating with Saber Interactive to develop a Kingdom Come: Deliverance port for the Nintendo Switch.

Games developed

References

External links 
 

2019 mergers and acquisitions
Companies based in Prague
Video game companies established in 2011
Video game companies of the Czech Republic
Video game development companies
Czech companies established in 2011